Heliorestis convulata is an alkaliphilic and coiled bacterium from the genus of Heliorestis which has been isolated from soil and water from the Lake El Hamra from Wadi El Natroun in Egypt.

References

Eubacteriales
Bacteria described in 2006